The city and unitary authority of Plymouth, Devon, England has 20 electoral wards. Of which seven are Labour, nine are Conservative and the remaining four are mixed. Each ward has three member representatives except Drake, Plympton Chaddlewood and Plympton Erle, which have two. 31 members represent the Labour Party, 25 represent the Conservative Party and 1 being Independent making a combined total of 57 member representatives. The wards fall into one of three constituencies that make up Plymouth: Moor View, Sutton and Devonport and South West Devon. The constituency of South West Devon extends beyond Plymouth with wards in Ivybridge outside of Plymouth unitary authority's boundaries.

Wards

References 

 
 

Wards of Devon
Politics of Plymouth, Devon